Wild Opera is No-Man's third studio album which displays art rock, trip hop and dub influences that were developed from improvisatory writing sessions.

History
In 1996, No-Man announced their return on a new label, 3rd Stone Ltd., home of Spacemen 3 and Bark Psychosis. This was led by the Housewives Hooked on Heroin single (a Hot Press "Single of the Fortnight"), a taster for the Wild Opera album which followed that autumn.

Most of the album had emerged from a series of semi-spontaneous improvisations recorded over a few hours, rather than planned-out attempts at songwriting. The raw results of three such sessions appeared on the album.

The title track itself is unlisted and appears as a 'hidden' bonus track.

Dry Cleaning Ray
One of the Wild Opera tracks -"Dry Cleaning Ray"- was released as a single in 1997. It also spawned the Dry Cleaning Ray mini-album. Dry Cleaning Ray presented reworked Wild Opera material, Gainsbourg covers, remixes (such as "Punished For Being Born", Muslimgauze's version of "Housewives Hooked on Heroin"), and instrumental moments. It also offered new songs such as "Sicknote."

Track listing 

Sample credits
"Pretty Genius" contains samples of "Walk On By", written by Burt Bacharach and Hal David and performed by Isaac Hayes.
"Dry Cleaning Ray" contains samples of "Fugue in D Minor", written by Johann Sebastian Bach and performed by Egg.

CD1 – Wild Opera 

Same as original release.

CD2 – Dry Cleaning Ray with bonus tracks

Personnel 

Tim Bowness – vocals, tapes, words
Steven Wilson – instruments, tapes, backing vocals (2, 5)

with:

Richard Barbieri – sample material
Natalie Box – violins (1, 2)
Mel Collins – sample material, saxophone (1)
Robert Fripp – sample material

References

1996 albums
No-Man albums